The Jordan Economic and Commerce Bureau, Washington D.C. is the economic department of the Embassy of Jordan, in Washington, D.C. The office was established in 1999 leading up to the signing of the Jordan–United States Free Trade Agreement in 2000.

The ECB provides a platform for American businesses to make the most out of economic opportunities in Jordan. It promotes Jordan’s status in the Middle East for foreign investment. In addition to providing news on Jordan-US relations, recent relevant policies, laws and business deals, the office provides companies and potential investors with information on government schemes that facilitate and encourage economic ties between Jordan and the United States. These include details of its trade agreements, economic arrangements through special ‘zones’, guidelines on exports and imports, as well as information on the developing sectors in the country.

Services 
The ECB provides information, support, and assistance in the following areas:
 
 Identifying trade and investment partners in the US and Jordan
 Export-import logistics
 Establishing businesses and joint ventures
 Business matchmaking
 Coordination of company site visits for potential investors
 Trade and investment events
 Providing information on Jordan's Economy
 Trade and investment events

Jordan-US Economic Relations 
Jordan and the U.S. established diplomatic relations on January 31, 1949. After more than six decades, Jordan became the first Arab country to sign a Free Trade Agreement with the U.S.  The U.S. currently ranks in Jordan’s top three trading partners, and joint-programs for economic development between both countries are now among the largest in the world.

Since the early years of Jordan–U.S. relations, both countries created a number of joint economic programs. The Jordan–U.S. partnership for economic development began in 1952 through President Truman’s Point IV Program. The program in Jordan later became what is now called the U.S. Agency for International Development (USAID). Over the course of nearly 60 years, USAID has partnered with Jordan on a wide range of projects in areas of water conservation, healthcare, education and training, economic growth, and governance. USAID projects in Jordan represent the largest per-capita U.S. assistance program in the world.

As the Jordanian economy continued to grow, the Jordan–U.S. economic partnership developed stronger ties and economic interdependence. The 1990s witnessed the signing of a number of economic agreements between Jordan and the U.S. A pioneer of such agreements was the Jordan–U.S. Bilateral Commission, which held its first meeting in 1994 to improve trade between both countries. Trade accompanied investments and the signing of the Jordan–U.S. Bilateral Investment Treaty (BIT) in 1997 was a natural development in both countries’ growing economic ties. By the late 1990s, an economic framework between Jordan and the U.S. solidified and continues to this day to promote and protect reciprocal trade and investment.

The emergence of a strong framework for Jordan–U.S. trade and investment equipped both countries to take further advantage of their economic ties. One of the leading initiatives that further opened the Jordanian and U.S. economies to one another was the Qualified Industrial Zones (QIZs) agreement. The agreement grants products of the QIZs duty- and quota-free access to American markets (the first QIZ in Jordan was founded in 1998). Jordan currently boasts 13 QIZs with over 50 factories and several satellite locations around the country.

The establishment of the Jordan–U.S. Free Trade Agreement (FTA) in 2000 is the third free trade agreement for the U.S. and its first with an Arab country. Trade rapidly increased between both countries as demonstrated by the fact that bilateral trade grew five-fold in ten years (currently exceeding $2 billion). The U.S. today ranks second in Jordan’s list of top export destinations and third in its list of top import sources. The Jordan–U.S. FTA also includes several provisions that promote intellectual property rights, environmental protection laws, labor rights, and electronic commerce. 

In May 2011, His Majesty King Abdullah II visited US President Barack Obama.  At this meeting, the two leaders expressed their support for one another and, in exchange for King Abdullah’s promise of political and economic reforms in Jordan, Obama promised to send approximately US$1 billion through OPIC, as well as 50,000 metric tons of wheat, to support such reforms.

To this day, several organizations actively work to foster and strengthen Jordan-U.S.economic ties.  The Jordanian Economic and Commerce Bureau (ECB) has operated since 1999, with the main objective of promoting investment and trade between Jordan and the U.S. In April 2010, the ECB, with the support of a number of partners organized the first Jordan-U.S. Investment and Trade Forum.  The Forum brought together more than 400 government dignitaries and business leaders from Jordan and the U.S. to explore the ample investment and trade opportunities in Jordan and to create additional economic partnerships that will continue to strengthen Jordan-U.S. relations.  The Forum also commemorated the 10th Anniversary of the signing of the Jordan-U.S. FTA, in addition to the 60th Anniversary of Jordan-U.S. relations, a partnership that continues to grow stronger to this day.

The Jordan-US Free Trade Agreement 
Jordan and the U.S. signed the Jordan–U.S. Free Trade Agreement (FTA) on October 24, 2000, after more than 50 years of positive diplomatic relations. Following the U.S.–Israel Free Trade Agreement (1985) and the North American Free Trade Agreement (NAFTA, 1994), the Jordan – U.S. FTA is the third free trade agreement for the U.S. and its first with an Arab country. The agreement came into force on December 17, 2001, which began a gradual reduction of customs duties in goods and services traded between Jordan and the U.S. over a transitional period of ten years. With the exception of a few items, trade between both countries has been fully liberalized since January 1, 2010.

In addition to the elimination of customs duties, the Jordan–U.S. FTA includes several provisions that promote intellectual property rights, environmental protection laws, labor rights, and electronic commerce in both countries. Furthermore, other Jordan – U.S. agreements such as the Generalized System of Preference (granting duty-free access to Jordanian hand-loomed and folklore textile products entering the U.S.) and the Qualified Industrial Zones (granting duty- and quota-free access to products entering the U.S. from specifically identified zones) encourage greater economic exchange between both countries.

References 

Jordan–United States relations
Economy of Jordan